FFV may refer to:
 FLOWERS for VASES / descansos, studio album by Hayley Williams from Paramore
Fairfield–Vacaville station, Amtrak station code FFV
 Family Force 5, an American dream
 Famous Foods of Virginia, also known as the Southern Biscuit Company
 Fast Flying Virginian, a defunct American passenger train
 Fatal Frame V, a 2014 video game
 Final Fantasy V, a 1992 video game
 First Families of Virginia
 Flexible-fuel vehicle
 Fly540, a Kenyan airline
 Football Federation Victoria, in Australia
 Franciscans of Life
 French Sailing Federation
 Försvarets fabriksverk/Förenade fabriksverken, the Swedish arms manufacturing agency
Feline foamy virus, a pathogen of cats